The Dorrigo Plateau is a plateau in the Northern Tablelands and New England regions of New South Wales, Australia. The plateau forms part of the Great Dividing Range and is sometimes referred to as the Dorrigo and Guy Fawkes Plateau.

Location and features
The plateau is defined by that area bounded in the south by the Dorrigo Escarpment, in the west by the New England Tableland, in the north by Hyland State Forest, Blicks River, Glen Fernaigh Creek and Nymboida River, and in the east by Bielsdown River up to the junction with Mathews Creek, then up to the head of Mathews Creek, then by the watershed extending generally south southeast to Dome Mountain.

Richard Craig was the first European to arrive at the plateau, following the traditional indigenous route to Armidale from the Grafton area. Using his skills as a horseman, Craig travelled along the western side of the Nymboida River. Timbergetters followed Craig through the sub tropical rainforest and many sawmills grew due to demand for timber, initially the highly prized Australian Red Cedar (Toona australis).

Today, the main access road traversing the plateau from east to west is the Waterfall Way.

The Dorrigo Plateau and surrounding Guy Fawkes River National Park area was created by successive basaltic lava flows from the Ebor Volcano covering the original granite base. Weathering from high rainfall caused an escarpment to form as the more ancient rocks underneath remained intact.

See also

Bellinger River National Park
Bielsdown River
Bindarri National Park
Dorrigo National Park
Junuy Juluum National Park
New England National Park

References

External links
Northern Rivers Geology Blog - Dorrigo Plateau

Northern Tablelands
New England (New South Wales)
Plateaus of Australia